The Fort Sumner Railroad Bridge, over the Pecos River  west of Fort Sumner, New Mexico, was built in 1905.  It was listed on the National Register of Historic Places in 1979.

It is a plate-girder design bridge,  in length, built by the Atchison, Topeka & Santa Fe Railway.  It consists of fifteen  Class AA Deck Plate Girders supported by 14 concrete piers and two concrete winged abutments.  It rises .

References

Bridges in New Mexico		
National Register of Historic Places in De Baca County, New Mexico
Bridges completed in 1905
1905 establishments in New Mexico Territory